Kontos may refer to:

Kontos (weapon), a pole weapon
Kontos (surname), a Greek surname
Contus, a pike with a pointed iron at the one end.